Ryan Kerby is an American politician and former educator from Idaho. Kerby is a Republican member of Idaho House of Representatives from District 9, seat A.

Early life 
Kerby was born in Clearwater River, Idaho.

Education 
Kerby earned a Bachelor of Science degree in Math from Biola College in La Mirada, California. Kerby earned a Master's degree from College of Idaho. Kerby completed educational specialist from University of Idaho.

Career 
Kerby was a superintendent of New Plymouth School District for 21 years until his retirement in June 2015.

On November 4, 2014, Kerby won the election and became a Republican member of Idaho House of Representatives for District 9, seat A. Kerby defeated Steve Worthley with 76.5% of the votes. On November 8, 2016, as an incumbent, Kerby won the election and continued serving District 9, seat A. Kerby defeated Rejeana A. Goolsby with 81.1% of the votes. On November 6, 2018, as an incumbent, Kerby won the election and continued serving District 9, seat A. Kerby defeated Allen Schmid with 75.9% of the votes.

In legislation, in December 2019  Kerby became the Vice chairman of House Education Committee.

Personal life 
Kerby's wife is Kathy Kerby, a school nurse.

References

External links 
 Ryan Kerby at ballotpedia.org

School superintendents in Idaho
Living people
College of Idaho alumni
Republican Party members of the Idaho House of Representatives
University of Idaho alumni
Year of birth missing (living people)
21st-century American politicians